P. brevirostris may refer to:
 Pachycrocuta brevirostris, a prehistoric hyena species
 Pericrocotus brevirostris, the short-billed minivet, a bird species
 Petalosarsia brevirostris, a marine crustacean species
 Phyllodytes brevirostris, a frog species endemic to Brazil

See also